Jablko is a Slovak political party founded by MEP Lucia Ďuriš Nicholsonová. At the moment, the party is in the process of creation and registration.

Party name 
According to Nicholsonová, there were already enough different abbreviations and all kinds of names, such as civil democrats, Christian democrats, civil liberals, progressive liberals, сhristians. It's boring, she says. Although they and their team considered such names as Istota, Stred, Medrná cesta, Obnova, she was not "hooked": she needed "something fresh, beautiful, juicy, tasty, with a beautiful story". And Apple is such a true expression of her political project.

History 
The creation of the party was announced on 11 January 2023. According to Nicholsonová, Jablko is a "modern, centrist and pro-European party".

The party plans to participate in the 2023 Slovak parliamentary election. The party sees Progressive Slovakia and Freedom and Solidarity as its potential coalition partners.

See also 

 Yabloko, a Russian political party of the same name

References 

Centrist parties in Slovakia
Liberal parties in Slovakia
Political parties established in 2023